Pazhassi Raja is a 1964 Malayalam biographical film, directed and produced by Kunchako. It is written by well known playwright Thikkodiyan and is based on the life of warrior king Kerala Varma Pazhassi Raja. It stars Kottarakkara Sreedharan Nair in the title role, with Prem Nazir, Sathyan, Satyapal, S. P. Pillai, Rajashree and Pankajavalli in other important roles.

Pazhassi Raja is the second historical film in Malayalam, the first one was Veluthamby Dalava (1962) by the same director. Pazhassi Raja was completely filmed from Kunchako's Udaya Studios, which resulted in the lack of technical perfection and eventually lead to the commercial failure of the film. Its music is composed by R. K. Shekhar, who debuted as a music director through this film.

Plot
The story is set at a time when the East India Company was trying to establish its control, and most of the city states in Kerala had surrendered to the company. Sankara Varma (Nanukuttan), king of Kurumbranad, had also surrendered. Kerala Varma (Kottarakkara Sreedharan Nair), king of Pazhassi and nephew of Sankara Varma, fought against the company. Sankara Varma's niece Ammu Thampuratty (Rajasree, Gracy in the title cards) and nephew Unni (Boban) escape and seek refuge in Pazhassi Raja's palace. Tipu Sultan invades Malabar in an attempt to bring the city states that surrendered to the Company under his control. Unable to fight with the ferocious troops of Tipu Sultan, the East India Company (EIC) decide to have a treaty with Pazhassi Raja with whose support they hoped to defeat Tipu Sultan. Pazhassi's guerrilla warfare succeeds, and the EIC manage to free all the city states captured by Tipu Sultan. Pazhassi's crafty uncle convinces the Company authorities to allow him to collect the taxes in Kottayam. He goes on to declare that he is the real heir to the dynasty. Pazhassi Raja opposes this move. The EIC officer Wellesley (Satyapal) invites Pazhassi Raja to his bungalow to discuss the issue. Ammu Thampuratti and Unni, who reach the bungalow in disguise, inform Pazhassi about the treacherous plans of the EIC. When Pazhassi defies the EIC, they attempt to arrest him. The Kurichya archers of Pazhassi defeat this ploy and rescue their king. The troops capture Pazhassi Raja's palace. The Raja and his military commandants and attendants, Kaitheri Ambu (Dr. Chandraguptan), Kannavathu Nambiar (Prem Nazir), Unni Moosa (Sankaradi) and the Kurichya leader Chandu ( Vincent Chacko), escape to the dense Puralimala forests from where they begin guerrilla warfare against the East India Company. An official of the company, Baber (Satyan), who reaches Pazhassi's hideout with the help of Pazhayam Veedan (Kottayam Chellappan), is beaten up and sent back with a warning. The EIC decide to go all out against Pazhassi. A bitter struggle ensues. Pazhassi manages to recapture his palace. In the meanwhile, Baber takes custody of Pazhassi's wife, Maakkam (Sreedevi) and his infant son (Ponnumol). The war intensifies. The East India Company try all nasty tricks to defeat the Raja. They even set his palace on fire. Finally, Pazhassi Raja's men are beaten. The 'Lion of Kerala', as Pazhassi was popularly known, swallows his diamond ring and commits suicide.

Cast
 Kottarakkara Sreedharan Nair as Kerala Varma Pazhassi Raja
 Prem Nazir as Kannavathu Nambiar
 Sathyan as Baber
 Satyapal as Commandant Wellesley
 Rajasree (Gracy) as Ammu Thampuratty
 Boban as Unni
 Pankajavalli
 Dr. Chandraguptan as Kaitheri Ambu
 Nanukuttan as Sankara Varma
 Sreedevi as Maakkam
 Kottayam Chellappan as Pazhayam Veedan 
 Vincent Chacko as Thalakkal Chanthu
 Sankaradi as Unni Moosa
 S. P. Pillai
 Manavalan Joseph
 Nellikkodu Bhaskaran

Soundtrack
The film features an acclaimed musical score and the soundtrack by R. K. Shekhar. It was his debut work, though he has worked in a lot of films as a conductor or as an uncredited music director. The songs became popular upon release and established a bright career for Shekhar. The soundtrack consists of 12 songs with lyrics by Vayalar Ramavarma.

"Chotta Muthal Chudala Vare" (by K. J. Yesudas), "Muthe Vaa Vaavo Muthu Kudame Vaa Vvaavo" (by P. Susheela), "Saayippe Saayippe, Aslam Alaikkum" (by P. Leela and Mehboob), "Kannu Randum Thaamarappoo" (by P. Susheela) and "Paathira Poovukal Vaarmudikettil" (by P. Leela) are considered evergreen hits.

References

External links 
 

1964 films
1960s Malayalam-language films
Indian biographical films
Indian black-and-white films
Kalarippayattu films
History of India on film
History of Kerala on film
Films set in the British Raj
Films shot in Kozhikode
Films shot in Kannur
Films shot in Thalassery
1960s biographical films
Films directed by Kunchacko